
Rotelsee is a lake near Simplon Pass in the canton of Valais, Switzerland.

References 

Rotel